Atalanta Mozzanica Calcio Femminile Dilettantistico, previously known as A.S.D. Mozzanica or Mozzanica Calcio Femminile, was an Italian women's football club from Mozzanica, in the Province of Bergamo.

The club was founded in 2002 in Mozzanica as A.S. Or. Mozzanica. On 22 September 2017 the club signed a sponsorship deal with Atalanta Bergamasca Calcio, which the club would use both the logos of Atalanta B.C. and A.S.D. Mozzanica on the shirt, as well as adding Atalanta to the denomination.

The club was dissolved in July 2019.

Name changes 
 2002 – A.S. Oratorio Mozzanica
 2004 – F.C.F. Mozzanica
 2007 – A.S.D. Mozzanica (under a merge with )
 2017 – Atalanta Mozzanica Calcio Femminile Dilettantistico

Stadium

See also 
 List of women's association football clubs

References

External links
 

Women's football clubs in Italy
Football clubs in Lombardy
Sport in the Province of Bergamo
Mozzanica
Mozzanica
Atalanta B.C.